Stere Zeană (born 26 March 1926, date of death unknown) was a Romanian footballer who played as a striker. He was also a manager.

International career
Stere Zeană played one friendly match for Romania, on 19 September 1954 under coach Ștefan Dobay in a 5–1 loss against Hungary.

Honours
Steaua București
Cupa României: 1948–49
Locomotiva București
Divizia B: 1955

References

External links
Stere Zeană at Labtof.ro
 

1926 births
Year of death missing
Romanian footballers
Romania international footballers
Place of birth missing
Association football forwards
Liga I players
Liga II players
Venus București players
FC Universitatea Cluj players
FC Steaua București players
FC Rapid București players
Romanian football managers